Cowden Meadow is a  biological Site of Special Scientific Interest east of Cowden in Kent.

This site has flora which are found on grassland sites which have not been cultivated for many years, such as quaking grass, oxeye daisy and pepper saxifrage. Wetter areas are dominated by hard rush.

A public footpath runs along the southern end of the site.

References

Sites of Special Scientific Interest in Kent